"Amish Paradise" is a 1996 single by satirist "Weird Al" Yankovic. It is a parody of the hip hop song "Gangsta's Paradise" by Coolio featuring L.V. (which itself is a reworking of the Stevie Wonder song "Pastime Paradise"). Featured on the album Bad Hair Day, it turns the original "Gangsta's Paradise", in which the narrator laments his dangerous way of life, on its head by presenting an Amish man praising his relatively plain and uncomplicated existence.

Track listing
 "Amish Paradise" – 3:20
 "Everything You Know Is Wrong" – 3:46
 "The Night Santa Went Crazy (Extra Gory Version)" – 3:59
 "Dare to Be Stupid (Instrumental)" – 3:25

Coolio's response
Yankovic sought permission from Coolio before making "Amish Paradise", offering a percentage of the revenues. Yankovic was given rights to use the song by the record company (non-exclusive rights holders), but not by Coolio himself, who, when presented with Weird Al's offer, declined.

Yankovic later stated on VH1's Behind the Music that he had written a sincere letter of apology to Coolio, which was never returned, and that Coolio never complained when he received his royalty check from proceeds of the song. A series of photos taken at the XM Satellite Radio booth at the 2006 Consumer Electronics Show suggests that Yankovic and Coolio had made amends. Coolio stated in a 2014 interview that the decision to refuse the parody at the time was "stupid" and he wished that someone on his management had stopped him, and then considered the final parody to be "funny".

During an interview with Sean Evans on Hot Ones in 2016, Coolio further expressed regret for how he initially responded to "Amish Paradise". "In hindsight, it was stupid of me to say something about [Yankovic] doing a parody of 'Gangsta's Paradise'," he said. "I mean, he did Michael Jackson, he did Prince. You know, people who were definitely more talented than I am. I think Prince did say something... but he wasn't very vocal about it like I was. And it just made me look dumb... It was one of the dumb things I did. And I'm willing to admit I did something stupid."

Music video
Weird Al directed the music video for "Amish Paradise" himself, as he has done for many of his music videos since 1986. The music video for "Amish Paradise" closely mirrors the "Gangsta's Paradise" music video, although several concepts have been parodied. The video also features Florence Henderson as the Michelle Pfeiffer character in the original video.

Chart performance

Rerecording
In 2022, for the film Weird: The Al Yankovic Story, Yankovic rerecorded the track, as well as four others. In the film, Yankovic's father reveals that he was raised Amish, and Yankovic finds a lyric sheet written by his father called "Amish Paradise" and decides to perform the song.

See also
 List of singles by "Weird Al" Yankovic
 List of songs by "Weird Al" Yankovic

References

External links

Amish Paradise On Spotify
Weird Al's Official Page

1996 singles
1996 songs
American hip hop songs
Amish in popular culture
Comedy rap songs
Music controversies
Music videos directed by "Weird Al" Yankovic
Satirical songs
Scotti Brothers Records singles
Songs about religion
Songs with lyrics by "Weird Al" Yankovic
Songs written by Coolio
Songs written by Stevie Wonder
"Weird Al" Yankovic songs